Augustus Henry Tulk (1810 – 1 September 1873) was the first librarian of the State Library of Victoria, Australia.  He also campaigned for the establishment of an art gallery in Victoria.

The State Library's cafe, 'Mr. Tulk', is named in his honour.

Life
Tulk was born in Richmond, Surrey, England, the son of Charles Augustus Tulk and his wife Susannah, and received a solid classical education at Winchester College. He emigrated from England to Australia for medical reasons in 1854.

Tulk was chosen from a short-list of forty eight applicants, and began his new job on 5 May 1856.  His legacy includes the collection of some 80,000 volumes he collected and a relatively advanced system of classification according to books' subjects.  Tulk  turned down offers of appointment from other libraries in Sydney and abroad. A noted linguist, Tulk continued his studies adding native Fijian and Aboriginal languages to his repertoire.

Notes

1810 births
1873 deaths
Australian librarians
Linguists from Australia
Linguists of Australian Aboriginal languages